Uncle Charlie & His Dog Teddy is the 1970 album from The Nitty Gritty Dirt Band that contains the hit song "Mr. Bojangles". The album reached No. 66 on US charts. Three singles charted: "Mr. Bojangles" reached No. 9, "House at Pooh Corner" reached No. 53, and "Some Of Shelly's Blues" reached No. 64. In Canada, the singles reached No. 2, No. 30, and No. 56.

The 1994 CD version has the title Uncle Charlie And His Dog on the spine.

Track listing
Side 1
"Some of Shelly's Blues"  (Michael Nesmith) – 2:51
"Prodigal's Return"  (Kenny Loggins, Dann Lottermoser) – 3:11
"The Cure"  (Jeff Hanna) – 2:11
"Travelin' Mood"  (James Waynes) – 2:39
"Chicken Reel"  (Traditional) – 0:55
"Yukon Railroad"  (Kenny Loggins, Dann Lottermoser) – 2:16
"Livin' Without You"  (Randy Newman) – 2:00
"Clinch Mountain Backstep"  (Ruby Rakes) – 2:31
"Rave On"  (Norman Petty, Bill Tilghman, Sonny West) – 2:56
"Billy in the Low Ground"  (Les Thompson) – 1:13
Side 2
"Jesse James"  (Traditional) – 0:50
"Uncle Charlie Interview"  (Uncle Charlie) – 1:38
"Mr. Bojangles"  (Jerry Jeff Walker) – 3:37
"Opus 36, Clementi"  (Muzio Clementi) – 1:42
"Santa Rosa"  (Kenny Loggins) – 2:24
"Propinquity"  (Michael Nesmith) – 2:20
"Uncle Charlie"  (Jimmie Fadden) – 1:49
"Randy Lynn Rag"  (Earl Scruggs) – 1:46
"House at Pooh Corner"  (Kenny Loggins) – 2:39
"Swanee River"  (Stephen Foster) – 0:36
"Uncle Charlie Interview #2 / Spanish Fandango"  (Traditional) – 2:36

Extra tracks on the 2003 CD reissue:
"Mississippi Rain" (Lottermoser) – 3:06
"What Goes On" (John Lennon, Paul McCartney, Richard Starkey) – 2:12

Charts

Personnel
The band
Les Thompson – electric bass, mandolin, electric guitar, vocals
Jimmie Fadden – lead acoustic and electric guitar, harmonica, washtub bass, vocals (drums not credited on LP)
Jeff Hanna – rhythm acoustic and electric guitar, drums, washboard, percussion, vocals
Jimmy Ibbotson – rhythm acoustic guitar, lead electric guitar, electric piano, drums, conga, accordion, vocals (keyboards not credited on LP)
John McEuen – banjo, mandolin, acoustic guitar, accordion (vocals, guitar, steel guitar not credited on LP)
Contributing musicians (credited on original LP)
Bill Cunningham
Maurice Manceau – guitar, keyboards, vocals (instrument not credited on LP)
Jim Gordon – horns, keyboards (instrument not credited on LP)
Mike Rubini
John London – bass (instrument not credited on LP)
Byron Berline – violin (instrument not credited on LP)
Russ Kunkel – drums (instrument not credited on LP)

Not credited on LP or CD
Chris Darrow – guitar, violin, vocals
Ralph Barr – guitar, vocals

Personnel on "Mr. Bojangles"
Mike Rubini - piano
Russ Kunkel - drums
Jeff Hanna - acoustic guitar, lead vocal
John McEuen - mandolin
Jimmy Ibbotson - accordion
Les Thompson - electric bass

These credits are provided by John McEuen via his website.

Production
Producer – William McEuen
Recording Engineer – Woody Woodward
Mixing – John McEuen/Jimmy Hoyson
Art Direction – Dean Torrence/Kittyhawk Graphics
Photography – William McEuen
2003 CD reissue with two additional tracks and new liner notes
Interview and liner notes – Robyn Flans

About the tracks
"Some of Shelly's Blues" was written by Michael Nesmith, best known as a member of The Monkees. Ibbotson and Hanna share the vocals. It features a harmonica break by Fadden. It was released as a single twice. Because the title does not appear in the lyrics, fans were confused about what song to request on the radio or buy.
"Travelin' Mood" was written and first recorded by R&B artist James "We Willie" Waynes in 1955. It is sung on this album by Fadden.
"Chicken Reel"  (Traditional) is an instrumental track.
"Yukon Railroad" is about two people falling in love while riding a train on the Yukon Railroad. The White Pass & Yukon Railroad goes from Skagway, Alaska, to (currently) Carcross, Yukon. However it used to go to Whitehorse, Yukon. The railroad was built during the Klondike gold rush, in the late 1890s. The song also talks about imagining all the gold on the train about "100 years ago."
On "Clinch Mountain Backstep" McEuen plays banjo, Thompson plays mandolin, Fadden plays one string washtub bass, and Hanna plays the washboard and cymbals. The song is credited to Ruby Rakes. Ruby Rakes Eubanks is the half sister of Ralph and Carter Stanley (The Stanley Brothers). She was assigned the rights to many of their songs for personal financial reasons.
"Rave On"  is the Buddy Holly song. Jimmy and Jeff share the lead vocal.
"Billy in the Low Ground" is a traditional tune played by Thompson on mandolin. It is a short song that fades in and then out.
"Jesse James" is a 1963 recording of Uncle Charlie, who was a relative of Bill McEuen's wife. It is a folk song that dates back to at least to 1924. Uncle Charlie stops mid-song saying "That's about all I can think of."
The "Uncle Charlie Interview" is from the same 1963 recording. He first gives some biographical information. He was born in Kaufman County, Texas, on September 11, 1886, and moved to California in 1906 (when he was 20 years old). He did not serve in either world war. He was the youngest in the family and took care of his parents in their old age. He then gets his dog Teddy to sing (howl) along with his harmonica. This leads directly into Mr. Bojangles, associating the real man with the song character.
"Mr. Bojangles" was written and recorded by Jerry Jeff Walker. Hanna heard the song on the radio one night and mentioned it to Jimmy Ibbotson. Ibbotson knew the song and actually had been carrying the single (a gift) around in his trunk for months. They cleaned it off and transcribed the song as best they could. However, they got a few words wrong, even on the final recording. This story is told in more colorful detail on the 2003 CD reissue.
"Opus 36" was written by English composer Muzio Clementi in 1797. Its full title is "Sonatina in C major, op.36, no.1". It was arranged and adapted by Walter McEuen and played on banjo by John (Walter) McEuen. On the original album cover and label the title appears as "Opus 36, Clementi (John)", but as just "Opus 36 on the inner sleeve. On the 2003 CD reissue it is listed as just "Opus 36".
"Uncle Charlie" is a harmonica and guitar instrumental.
On "Randy Lynn Rag" producer Bill McEuen brought all the studio personnel into the studio as an audience to inspire the band to cook on the tune. At the end of the track, the crowd applauds and cheers. Finally someone says, "Thank you for the clap", then two more claps lead seamlessly into the next song.
When "House at Pooh Corner" was played for him by its songwriter, Kenny Loggins, Ibbotson wanted to record it. When Ibbotson was in second grade he was struck with polio. While he was at home that year he read a lot of A. A. Milne's Winnie The Pooh stories, so the characters had warm place in his heart.
"Swanee River"  (Stephen Foster) is an instrumental played by Fadden on harmonica.
"What Goes On" is a Beatles song, and the only song with Thompson handling the lead vocal.

References
The information in this article comes from the liner notes of the original LP and the 2003 CD reissue, unless otherwise noted.

Nitty Gritty Dirt Band albums
1970 albums
Liberty Records albums
Albums with cover art by Dean Torrence